Brunellia elliptica is a species of plant in the Brunelliaceae family. It is endemic to Colombia.

References

elliptica
Endangered plants
Endemic flora of Colombia
Taxonomy articles created by Polbot